George Edward Gray (born March 11, 1967) is an American television personality, game show host, comedian, and announcer.

Early life and career
Born in Ballwin, Missouri, Gray attended high school in Tucson, Arizona, and graduated from the University of Arizona, during which time he played drums with local band The Reason Why with his two English buddies Tony Randall and Shane Lamont. After working as a sketch and stand-up comedian, Gray's first television hosting gig was for the Fox Movie Channel doing a show called FXM Friday Nights. He then appeared as co-host of the long-running series Movies For Guys Who Like Movies on TBS.

Hosting career
Gray's first in-studio show was Extreme Gong, an updated version of The Gong Show, on GSN in the late 1990s. He also hosted the first season of the American version of Junkyard Wars, which was nominated for a prime-time Emmy.

Gray was chosen in 2001 by NBC Enterprises to host the daily syndicated American version of the game show The Weakest Link, which aired from 2002-03. TV critic Steve Rogers likened Gray's hosting style to the demeanor of a "class clown", in contrast to the "severe schoolmarm" attitude of original The Weakest Link host Anne Robinson.

After hosting the reality series Todd TV on FX and the GSN special National Lampoon's Greek Games, in late 2004, Gray went on to become the co-host of NBC's $25 Million Dollar Hoax. He hosted ESPN's reality sports competition I'd Do Anything. Beginning in 2006, he hosted the HGTV show What's With That House? (a.k.a. That House), as well as HGTV's Manland and the building competition Summer Showdown.

The Price Is Right
After previously appearing with a group of rotating auditioning announcers, Gray officially became the fourth regular
announcer on The Price Is Right on April 18, 2011, succeeding Rich Fields.

On January 15, 2015, Gray fell off of a treadmill he was describing during the show. The video quickly went viral.

Personal life

He married his fiancée, Brittney Green, on April 13, 2019.

Health

On the morning of April 20, 2020, Gray was hospitalized after suffering from three major heart attacks. He woke up with the chest pains and thought it was indigestion but his condition deteriorated. He suffered his first heart attack on the way to the hospital, his second after failed surgeries as he was walking around in the hospital, and his third as doctors were going to place a third stent in his heart. The surgeons then performed a quadruple bypass.

Select filmography

Television 

 1996, The Newlywed Game, audience warmup
 2004, I'd Do Anything, host
 2011, Car Science, narrator, 5 episodes
 2011-present, The Price Is Right, announcer
 2012, The Young and the Restless as newscaster, 1 episode
 2016, Scorpion as himself
 2022, The Bold and the Beautiful as Waiter, 1 episode

Film 

 1987, Cant Buy Me Love as Bobby Hilton
 1994, Dead Beat as Cop Outside
 2011, eCubid as TV announcer
 2011, Jack and Jill as The Price Is Right announcer
 2012, It's a Boy! as Baby 1

Music video 

 2013, Bob Dylan: Like a Rolling Stone as himself

References

External links

 
 

1967 births
American game show hosts
American male comedians
Game show announcers
Living people
People from Ballwin, Missouri
The Price Is Right
University of Arizona alumni
Comedians from Missouri
21st-century American comedians